Felix Jeffrey Farrell (born February 28, 1937) is an American former competition swimmer, Olympic champion, and former world record-holder in multiple relay events.

Farrell won a gold medal in the men's 100-meter freestyle at the 1959 Pan American Games in Chicago.  In 1960, six days after having an appendectomy, Farrell qualified at the U.S. Olympic Trials.  He competed at the 1960 Olympic Games in Rome, where he received gold medals as a member of the winning U.S. teams in the 4×100-meter medley relay and the 4×200-meter freestyle relay.

Farrell is a multiple U.S. Masters Swimming world-record holder, and has held the fastest national times in his age group in dozens of events over past decades.  He was photographed for and featured in ESPN's "The Body" issue in 2010.

Farrell was inducted into the International Swimming Hall of Fame in 1968, and the International Masters Swimming Hall of Fame in 2011.  He is the only swimmer to be inducted in both halls.

He  set world records for Masters Swimming up until 2011.  He has written a book about his Olympic experiences titled My Olympic Story, Rome 1960.

See also
 List of members of the International Swimming Hall of Fame
 List of Olympic medalists in swimming (men)
 List of Yale University people
 World record progression 4 × 100 metres freestyle relay
 World record progression 4 × 100 metres medley relay
 World record progression 4 × 200 metres freestyle relay

References

External links

 Jeff Farrell – Biography at VintageTeamPress.com
 
 

1937 births
Living people
American male freestyle swimmers
World record setters in swimming
Olympic gold medalists for the United States in swimming
Pan American Games gold medalists for the United States
Swimmers from Detroit
Swimmers at the 1959 Pan American Games
Swimmers at the 1960 Summer Olympics
Yale Bulldogs men's swimmers
Medalists at the 1960 Summer Olympics
Pan American Games medalists in swimming
Medalists at the 1959 Pan American Games